FK Vrapčište is a football club based in the village of Vrapčište, near Gostivar, Republic of Macedonia. They are currently competing in the Macedonian Third League (West Division).

History
The club was founded in 1958.

It used the name FK Murgovec until 2011.

References

External links
Official Website 
Club info at MacedonianFootball 
Football Federation of Macedonia 

Association football clubs established in 1947
Vrapciste
1947 establishments in the Socialist Republic of Macedonia
FK